Nuri Sojliu (1870–1940) was an Albanian politician. He was one of the signatories of the Albanian Declaration of Independence.

References

19th-century Albanian politicians
Signatories of the Albanian Declaration of Independence
20th-century Albanian politicians
People from Struga
1870 births
1940 deaths
Albanians from the Ottoman Empire
People from Manastir vilayet
All-Albanian Congress delegates